Saan Darating ang Umaga? (International title: Morning Awaits / ) is a Philippine television drama series broadcast by GMA Network. Based on a 1983 Philippine film of the same title, the series is the eleventh instalment of Sine Novela. Directed by Maryo J. de los Reyes, it stars Yasmien Kurdi. It premiered on November 10, 2008 on the network's Dramarama sa Hapon line up replacing Gaano Kadalas ang Minsan. The series concluded on February 27, 2009 with a total of 80 episodes. It was replaced by Dapat Ka Bang Mahalin? in its timeslot.

Cast and characters

Lead cast
 Yasmien Kurdi as Shayne Rodrigo

Supporting cast
 Lani Mercado as Lorrie Rodrigo
 Joel Torre as Ruben Rodrigo
 Jacob Rica as Joel Rodrigo
 Dion Ignacio as Raul Agoncillo
 Andrea del Rosario as Ms. Patricia Bernales
 Gary Estrada as Dindo Rodrigo
 Pinky Amador as Agatha Rodrigo
 Charlie Davao as Leonardo Rodrigo
 Shirley Fuentes as Marinel "Mylene" Medina Michikawa / Yaya Rose
 Arci Muñoz as Bianca
 Luz Valdez as Yaya Sabel
 Vaness del Moral as Donna

Guest cast
 Deborah Sun as Melody Valera / Bea Torralba
 Nicole Dulalia as young Shayne
 Gay Balignasay as Acy
 Lui Manansala as Olive
 Joseph Bitangcol as Mark

Ratings
According to AGB Nielsen Philippines' Mega Manila household television ratings, the pilot episode of Saan Darating ang Umaga? earned a 22.3% rating. While the final episode scored a 23.4% rating.

Accolades

References

External links
 

2008 Philippine television series debuts
2009 Philippine television series endings
Filipino-language television shows
GMA Network drama series
Live action television shows based on films
Television shows set in the Philippines